Rangri is a dialect of the Malvi language of India.

References 

Indo-Aryan languages
Languages of India